Salsalate is a medication that belongs to the salicylate and nonsteroidal anti-inflammatory drug (NSAID) classes.

Salsalate is the generic name of a prescription drug marketed under the brandnames Mono-Gesic, Salflex, Disalcid, and Salsitab. Other generic and brand name formulations may be available.

Mechanism of action
Relative to other NSAIDs, salsalate has a weak inhibitory effect on the cyclooxygenase enzyme and decreases the production of several proinflammatory chemical signals such as interleukin-6, TNF-alpha, and C-reactive protein.

The mechanism through which salsalate is thought to reduce the production of these inflammatory chemical signals is through the inhibition of IκB kinase resulting in decreased action of NF-κB genes. This mechanism is thought to be responsible for salsalate's insulin-sensitizing and blood sugar lowering properties.

Medical uses
Salsalate may be used for inflammatory disorders such as rheumatoid arthritis or noninflammatory disorders such as osteoarthritis.

Safety
The risk of bleeding is a common concern with use of the NSAID class of medications. However, the bleeding risk associated with salsalate is lower than that associated with aspirin use.

Research

Salsalate has been proposed for the prevention and treatment of type 2 diabetes mellitus due to its ability to lower insulin resistance associated with inflammation and may be useful in prediabetes. However, the use of salsalate to prevent the progression from prediabetes to type 2 diabetes mellitus has received limited study.

History

Salsalate had been suggested as possible treatment for diabetes as early as 1876.

Synthesis

References 

Nonsteroidal anti-inflammatory drugs
Salicylate esters
Salicylic acids
3-Hydroxypropenals
Salicylyl esters